Luiz Carlos Guarnieri (born August 13, 1971) is a former Brazilian football player.

Club statistics

References

External links

kyotosangadc

1971 births
Living people
Brazilian footballers
Brazilian expatriate footballers
J1 League players
Japan Football League (1992–1998) players
Mogi Mirim Esporte Clube players
Clube Atlético Mineiro players
Coritiba Foot Ball Club players
Santa Cruz Futebol Clube players
Kyoto Sanga FC players
Expatriate footballers in Japan
Association football defenders